Maggiora is an Italian surname. Notable people with the surname include:

 Domenico Maggiora, Italian professional football coach and a former player
 Eduardo della Maggiora, Chilean triathlete and businessman
 Pier Paolo Maggiora, Italian architect

See also
 Maggiora
 Maggiora (disambiguation)

Italian-language surnames